The Audeini are a tribe of moths in the family Erebidae.

Taxonomy
The tribe is most closely related to the tribe Catocalini, also within Erebinae.

Genera

Audea
Crypsotidia
Hypotacha

References

 
Erebinae
Moth tribes